Ana Rajković  (born 4 September 1996) is a Montenegrin handball player who plays for the club Yenimahalle Bld. SK (women's handball).

References

1996 births
Living people
Montenegrin female handball players
Sportspeople from Podgorica